Jeoung Young-sik (also Jeong or Jung, born 20 January 1992) is a South Korean table tennis player. He debuted internationally in 2010 and won a silver and a bronze medal at the Asian Games. Between 2010 and 2018 he won six bronze medals at the world championships. He reached the world ranking #7 in February 2017. His father Jeoung Hae-chul was also a competitive table tennis player.

Career

2021 
Jeoung completed his mandatory military service from mid-2019 to March of 2021. He will be representing South Korea at the Tokyo Olympics in the team event as well as the men's singles event.

Jeoung upset Timo Boll in the round of 16 to reach the quarter-finals of the Tokyo Olympics, where he lost to Fan Zhendong.

Following the Olympics, Jeoung withdrew from the Korean National Team for the remainder of 2021, including the World Championships in November. The stated reason was to allow more opportunities for his younger teammates.

References

External links

 
 
 

1992 births
Living people
Olympic table tennis players of South Korea
South Korean male table tennis players
Table tennis players at the 2016 Summer Olympics
Table tennis players at the 2010 Asian Games
Table tennis players at the 2018 Asian Games
Asian Games medalists in table tennis
Asian Games silver medalists for South Korea
Asian Games bronze medalists for South Korea
Medalists at the 2010 Asian Games
Medalists at the 2018 Asian Games
Universiade medalists in table tennis
World Table Tennis Championships medalists
South Korean expatriate sportspeople in China
Universiade bronze medalists for South Korea
Table tennis players at the 2020 Summer Olympics